The term Oswego bass can refer to one of two species of sunfish:

 The largemouth bass (Micropterus salmoides)
 The black crappie (Pomoxis nigromaculatus)